El Geish is a station on Cairo Metro, part of phase 1 of Line 3. it is located in El-Geish Square.

History
El Geish Station was inaugurated on 21 February 2012 as part of phase 1 of Line 3.

Overview
The station consists of three floors, with four entrances and elevators to transport passengers from the street level to the station platform and the length of the station is 150 meters and width of 19.5 meters and a depth of 22.1 meters from the station ground.

The station has a contactless fare collection system as well as an integrated supervision and communication system supplied by the Thales Group.

Station layout

Notable places nearby
 Mosque of al-Zahir Baybars
 El Daher district

See also
 Cairo Metro
 Cairo Metro Line 3
 List of Cairo Metro stations

References

External links
Cairo Metro Website
National Authority For Tunnels Official Website
Cairo: Culture, Transportation & Neighborhoods

Cairo metro stations
2012 establishments in Egypt
Railway stations opened in 2012